Chaberkowo  is a village in the administrative district of Gmina Purda, within Olsztyn County, Warmian-Masurian Voivodeship, in northern Poland. It is located within historic Warmia.

The village has a population of 56.

References

Chaberkowo